Tattoo Nightmares  is an American reality television series based in North Hollywood that broadcast on Spike from October 16, 2012. The series showcase the horror stories behind the public's unfortunate tattoos and the tattoo artists attempts to fix them. The cast include Big Gus, Jasmine Rodriguez and Tommy Helm.

Cast

International broadcasts
Tattoo Nightmares aired in the UK and Ireland on the TV channel truTV.

References

External links
 Tattoo Nightmares on Spike

2012 American television series debuts
2015 American television series endings
2010s American reality television series
Spike (TV network) original programming
Tattooing television series